Harvey Raymond Randall Birdman is a fictional superhero/attorney at law who first appeared on the Hanna-Barbera show Birdman and the Galaxy Trio (1967–1968) as Ray Randall, Birdman, voiced by Keith Andes. After returning as guest host in Space Ghost Coast to Coast (1994–2001; 2001–2004; 2006–2008) as Harvey Birdman, voiced by Scott Finnell, he received a new spin-off solo series in Harvey Birdman, Attorney at Law (2000–2007), voiced by Gary Cole, depicting his legal career. The character returned as United States Attorney General in Harvey Birdman: Attorney General (2018).

Character history

Birdman and the Galaxy Trio
Birdman was an ordinary human who has been endowed by the sun god Ra with the ability to shoot solar rays from his fists and project quasi-solid "solar shields" to defend himself against attacks (Birdman's origin is only vaguely, and only briefly, hinted at during the series. His real name is there given as Raymond "Ray" Randall). After he had acquired his avian—and other—powers, he was recruited by a top-secret government agency, Inter-Nation Security, and now works full-time fighting crime, assisted by his pet eagle, who responds to the name of "Avenger". In addition to the abilities he received from Ra, Birdman also possesses the power of flight, thanks to the giant wings which sprout from his back. It is possible Birdman is fireproof; being forced into an incinerator recharged rather than hurt him. His sole weakness is that he has to recharge his superhuman powers periodically, through exposure either to the sun's rays or to a comparable source of heat and/or light such as a desk lamp (when he was once shrunken to insect proportions) or the aforementioned incinerator, a weakness that is exposed in nearly every episode. His trademark is his battle cry of "Biiiiirdman!!!" whenever he goes into battle.

Space Ghost Coast to Coast
In the 1990s, Cartoon Network decided to base new comedy shows on older characters (although in many cases, that simply meant creating a more or less original character sharing their basic name and appearance). Their earliest show of this style was Space Ghost Coast to Coast, where Birdman appeared in five episodes, voiced by Scott Finnell. On the show, he was portrayed comically; depressed, out-of-work and desperate for money. Birdman hosted the show in the episodes "Pilot" and "Sequel", and was fired on both occasions. It was here revealed, contradicting the original Birdman show, that his first name was Harvey. "Harvey Birdman" was the name that writer Evan Dorkin came up with.

Harvey Birdman, Attorney at Law
Birdman later got his own show, Harvey Birdman, Attorney at Law, now voiced by Gary Cole. In the show, Harvey is a defense attorney, and his clients are generally classic Hanna-Barbera characters given new roles (Fred Flintstone appears, for example, as a mafia don, and Boo-Boo Bear is accused in one episode of being a mad bomber). Many of Birdman's former associates and enemies appear on the show in supporting roles (the character Reducto, now given the first name Myron, regularly appears as a prosecuting attorney, and Mentok the Mind-Taker judges cases from late Season One onward). Instead of being a clever superhero, this version of Birdman is portrayed as a semi-competent, bungling lawyer, although among the show's increasingly outlandish cast of characters, he is often the straight man.

Other appearances
Harvey Birdman, along with Space Ghost, appeared in the background in multiple scenes of the Season 4 episode of The Powerpuff Girls titled "Members Only".

Harvey Birdman appeared in the Villainous episode "BH's Bizzare Bad-Venture".

References

Characters created by Alex Toth
Cartoon Network Studios superheroes
Hanna-Barbera superheroes
Fictional lawyers
Fictional businesspeople
Television characters introduced in 1967
Harvey Birdman, Attorney at Law